Presolar grains are interstellar solid matter in the form of tiny solid grains that originated at a time before the Sun was formed. Presolar stardust grains formed within outflowing and cooling gases from earlier presolar stars.

The stellar nucleosynthesis that took place within each presolar star gives to each granule an isotopic composition unique to that parent star, which differs from the isotopic composition of our solar system's matter as well as from the galactic average. These isotopic signatures often fingerprint very specific astrophysical nuclear processes that took place within the parent star and prove their presolar origin.

Terminology

Meteoriticists often use the term to represent stardust, grains that originated within a single star and which they extract from meteorites for study. Because most interstellar grains are not stardust from a single star, however, being instead interstellar cloud matter accreted by smaller presolar grains, most presolar grains are also not stardust. Logically, all stardust are presolar grains; but not all presolar grains are stardust. This confusing terminology is heavily entrenched among 21st century meteoriticists who prefer to use the terms interchangeably, however, so both usages should employ or utilize the expression presolar stardust grains for stardust.

History
In the 1960s, the noble gases neon and xenon were discovered to have unusual isotopic ratios in primitive meteorites; their origin and the type of matter that contained them was a mystery. These discoveries were made by vaporizing a bulk sample of a meteorite within a mass spectrometer, in order to count the relative abundance of the isotopes of the very small amount of noble gases trapped as inclusions. During the 1970s similar experiments discovered more components of trapped xenon isotopes. Competing speculations about the origins of the xenon isotopic components were advanced, all within the existing paradigm that the variations were created by processes within an initially homogeneous solar gas cloud.

A new theoretical framework for interpretation was advanced during the 1970s when Donald D. Clayton rejected the popular belief among meteoriticists that the solar system began as a uniform hot gas. Instead he predicted that unusual but predictable isotopic compositions would be found within thermally condensed interstellar grains that had condensed during mass loss from stars of differing types. He argued that such grains exist throughout the interstellar medium. Clayton's first papers using that idea in 1975 pictured an interstellar medium populated with supernova grains that are rich in the radiogenic isotopes of Ne and Xe that had defined the extinct radioactivities.  Clayton defined several types of stardust presolar grains likely to be discovered: stardust from red giant stars, sunocons (acronym from SUperNOva CONdensates) from supernovae, nebcons from nebular condensation by accretion of cold cloud gaseous atoms and molecules, and novacons from nova condensation. Despite vigorous and  continuous active development of this picture, Clayton's suggestions lay unsupported by others for a decade until such grains were discovered within meteorites.

The first unambiguous consequence of the existence of stardust within meteorites came from the laboratory of Edward Anders in Chicago, who found using traditional mass spectrometry that the xenon isotopic abundances contained within an acid-insoluble carbonaceous residue that remained after the meteorite bulk had been dissolved in acids matched almost exactly the predictions for isotopic xenon in red giant stardust. It then seemed certain that stardust grains were contained within Anders' acid-insoluble residue. Finding the actual stardust grains and documenting them was a much harder challenge that required locating the grains and showing that their isotopes matched those within the red-giant star. There followed a decade of intense experimental searching in the attempt to isolate individual grains of those xenon carriers. But what was really needed to discover stardust was a new type of mass spectrometer that could measure the smaller number of atoms in a single grain. Sputtering ion probes were pursued by several laboratories in the attempt to demonstrate such an instrument. But the contemporary ion probes needed to be technologically much better.

In 1987 diamond grains and silicon carbide grains  were found to exist abundantly in those same acid-insoluble residues and also to contain large concentrations of noble gases. Significant isotopic anomalies were in turn measured by improvements in secondary ion mass spectrometry (SIMS) within the structural chemical elements of these grains. Improved SIMS experiments showed that the silicon isotopes within each SiC grain did not have solar isotopic ratios but rather those expected in certain red-giant stars. The finding of stardust is therefore dated 1987. To measure the isotopic abundance ratios of the structural elements (e.g. silicon in an SiC grain) in microscopic stardust grains had required two difficult technological and scientific steps: 1) locating micron-sized stardust grains within the meteorite's overwhelming mass; 2) development of SIMS technology to a sufficiently high level to measure isotopic abundance ratios within micron-sized grains. Ernst Zinner became an important leader in SIMS applications to microscopic grains.

In January 2020, analysis of the Murchison meteorite found in Australia in 1969 revealed that its stardust formed 5 to 7 billion years ago, older than Earth's 4.6 billion year-old sun, making the meteor and its stardust the oldest solid material ever discovered on Earth.

In meteorites
Presolar grains are the solid matter that was contained in the interstellar gas before the Sun formed. The stardust component can be identified in the laboratory by their abnormal isotopic abundances and consists of refractory minerals which survived the collapse of the solar nebula and the subsequent formation of planetesimals.

To meteorite researchers, the term presolar grains has come to mean presolar grains found in meteorites, which consist overwhelmingly of stardust. Many other types of cosmic dust have not been detected in meteorites. Presolar stardust grains comprise only about 0.1 percent of the total mass of particulate matter found in meteorites. Such grains are isotopically-distinct material found in the fine-grained matrix of meteorites, such as primitive chondrites.  Their isotopic differences from the encasing meteorite require that they predate the Solar System. The crystallinity of those clusters ranges from micrometer-sized silicon carbide crystals (up to 1013 atoms), down to that of nanometer-sized diamond (about 1000 atoms), and unlayered graphene crystals of fewer than 100 atoms. The refractory grains achieved their mineral structures by condensing thermally within the slowly cooling expanding gases of supernovae and of red giant stars.

Characterization 
Presolar grains are investigated using scanning or transmission electron microscopes (SEM/TEM), and mass spectrometric methods (noble gas mass spectrometry, resonance ionization mass spectrometry (RIMS), secondary ion mass spectrometry (SIMS, NanoSIMS)).  Presolar grains that consist of diamonds are only a few nanometers in size and are, therefore, called nanodiamonds. Because of their small size, nanodiamonds are hard to investigate and, although they are among the first presolar grains discovered, relatively little is known about them.  The typical sizes of other presolar grains are in the range of micrometers.

Presolar grains consisting of the following minerals have so far been identified:

diamond (C) nanometer-sized grains (~ diameter) possibly formed by vapor deposition
graphite (C) particles and anions, some with unlayered graphene cores
silicon carbide (SiC) submicrometer to micrometer sized grains.  Presolar SiC occurs as single-polytype grains or polytype intergrowths.  The atomic structures observed contain the two lowest order polytypes: hexagonal 2H and cubic 3C (with varying degrees of stacking fault disorder) as well as 1-dimensionally disordered SiC grains. In comparison, SiC synthesized in terrestrial laboratories is known to form over a hundred polytypes.
titanium carbide (TiC) and other carbides within C and SiC grains
silicon nitride
corundum
spinel
hibonite
titanium oxide
silicate minerals (olivine and pyroxene)

Information on stellar evolution 
The study of presolar grains provides information about nucleosynthesis and stellar evolution. Grains bearing the isotopic signature of "r-process" (rapid neutron capture) and alpha process (alpha capture) types of nucleosynthesis are useful in testing models of supernova explosions.

For example, some presolar grains (supernova grains) have very large excesses of calcium-44, a stable isotope of calcium which normally composes only 2% of the calcium abundance. The calcium in some presolar grains is composed primarily of 44Ca, which is presumably the remains of the extinct radionuclide titanium-44, a titanium isotope which is formed in abundance in Type II supernovae such as SN 1987A after rapid capture of four alpha particles by 28Si, after the process of silicon burning normally begins, and prior to the supernova explosion. However, 44Ti has a half-life of only 59 years, and thus it is soon converted entirely to 44Ca. Excesses of the decay products of the longer-lived, but extinct, nuclides calcium-41 (half-life 99,400 years) and aluminium-26 (730,000 years) have also been detected in such grains. The rapid-process isotopic anomalies of these grains include relative excesses of nitrogen-15 and oxygen-18 relative to Solar System abundances, as well as excesses of the neutron-rich stable nuclides 42Ca and 49Ti.

Other presolar grains (AGB star grains) provide isotopic and physical information on asymptotic giant branch stars, which have manufactured the largest portion of the refractory elements lighter than iron in the galaxy. Because the elements in these particles were made at different times (and places) in the early Milky Way, the set of collected particles further provides insight into galactic evolution prior to the formation of the Solar System.

In addition to providing information on nucleosynthesis of the grain's elements, solid grains provide information on the physico-chemical conditions under which they condensed, and on events subsequent to their formation.   For example, consider red giants — which produce much of the carbon in our galaxy. Their atmospheres are cool enough for condensation processes to take place, resulting in the precipitation of solid particles (i.e., multiple atom agglomerations of elements such as carbon) in their atmosphere. This is unlike the atmosphere of the Sun, which is too hot to allow atoms to build up into more complex molecules. These solid fragments of matter are then injected into the interstellar medium by radiation pressure. Hence, particles bearing the signature of stellar nucleosynthesis provide information on (i) condensation processes in red giant atmospheres, (ii) radiation and heating processes in the interstellar medium, and (iii) the types of particles that carried the elements of which we are made, across the galaxy to our Solar System.

See also

 Circumstellar dust
 Cosmic dust
 Cosmochemistry
 Extraterrestrial diamonds
 Extraterrestrial materials
 Glossary of meteoritics
 Interplanetary dust cloud
 List of meteorite minerals

References

External links
Presolar grain research
Presolar grains in meteorites
Moving Stars and Shifting Sands of Presolar History
Presolar Grains in Meteorites: An Overview and Some Implications

Cosmic dust
Interstellar media
Meteorite mineralogy and petrology
Meteorite minerals
Nucleosynthesis